Lezina is a cricket genus and the sole genus in the subfamily Lezininae found in northern Africa and the Middle-East; it was formerly included in the family Gryllacrididae.

Species 
 Lezina acuminata Ander, 1938  
 Lezina arabica Karny, 1937  
 Lezina armata Popov, G. B., 1984  
 Lezina concolor Walker, F., 1869  
 Lezina mutica (Brunner von Wattenwyl, 1888)  
 Lezina obscura (Burr, 1900)  
 Lezina omanica Popov, G. B., 1984  
 Lezina parva Popov, G. B., 1984  
 Lezina persica (Adelung, 1902)  
 Lezina peyerimhoffi (Chopard, 1929)  
 Lezina saudiya Popov, G. B., 1984  
 Lezina zarudnyi (Adelung, 1902)

References

External links 

Ensifera genera
Anostostomatidae